Anthony Jerome Cox (October 21, 1890 - January 13, 1972) was an American politician. He was a member of the Mississippi State Senate, representing the 38th District, from 1916 to 1920.

Biography 
Anthony Jerome Cox was born on October 21, 1890, near Smithville, Mississippi. He was the son of James P. Cox and Polly Annie (Irvin) Cox. Cox attended the public schools of Monroe County, Mississippi, and attended high schools in Hatley, Mississippi, and Smithville. He then taught for several years before engaging in farming and raising livestock. In 1915, Cox was elected to represent the 38th District as a Democrat in the Mississippi State Senate for the 1916-1920 term. In 1961, Cox moved to Tennessee. He died at his home in Concord, Tennessee, on January 13, 1972.

Personal life 
Cox was a member of the Woodmen of the World. He was married to Jeffie Mae, and they had at least three children, including a son and two daughters.

References 

1890 births
1972 deaths
People from Monroe County, Mississippi
Democratic Party Mississippi state senators
Farmers from Mississippi
People from Knox County, Tennessee